The 1872 Connecticut gubernatorial election was held on April 1, 1872. Incumbent governor and Republican nominee Marshall Jewell defeated Democratic nominee Richard D. Hubbard with 50.02% of the vote.

General election

Candidates
Major party candidates
Marshall Jewell, Republican
Richard D. Hubbard, Democratic

Other candidates
Francis Gillette, Temperance
Albert R. Harrison, Labor Reform

Results

References

1872
Connecticut
Gubernatorial